General Castle may refer to:

Fred F. Castle Jr. (fl. 1960s–2000s), U.S. Air Force Reserve brigadier general
Frederick Walker Castle (1908–1944), U.S. Army Air Forces brigadier general

See also
John G. Castles (1925–2001), U.S. Army major general
Attorney General Castle (disambiguation)